The 1938–39 Toronto Maple Leafs season was Toronto's 22nd season of operation in the National Hockey League (NHL). The Maple Leafs again advanced to the Stanley Cup Final, losing to the Boston Bruins.

Offseason

Regular season

Final standings

Record vs. opponents

Schedule and results

Playoffs
The Maple Leafs finished in third place in the regular season, which matched them up against the New York Americans in the first round, best of three series.  After sweeping the Americans in 2 games, the Leafs played the Detroit Red Wings in the next round in another best of three series, which they won 2–1.  In the finals, they played the Boston Bruins, who defeated them 4–1.

Player statistics

Regular season
Scoring

Goaltending

Playoffs
Scoring

Goaltending

Awards and records

Transactions
October 12, 1938: Traded Charlie Conacher to the Detroit Red Wings for $16,000
November 3, 1938: Acquired Gus Marker from the Montreal Maroons for $4,000
November 15, 1938: Acquired Norman Mann from the New York Rangers for $4,000
December 8, 1938: Acquired Doc Romnes from the Chicago Black Hawks for Bill Thoms
December 19, 1938: Acquired Bucko McDonald from the Detroit Red Wings for Bill Thomson and $10,000

Farm teams
 Syracuse Stars

See also
1938–39 NHL season

References

Toronto Maple Leafs seasons
Toronto
Toronto